Jake Packard (born 20 June 1994) is an Australian swimmer.

He competed at the 2015 World Aquatics Championships, where he won a silver medal in the  medley relay. He won a bronze medal in  medley at the 2016 Summer Olympics in Rio de Janeiro.

References

External links
 
 
 
 
 
 

1994 births
Living people
Australian male breaststroke swimmers
Olympic swimmers of Australia
Swimmers at the 2016 Summer Olympics
Olympic bronze medalists in swimming
Olympic bronze medalists for Australia
Medalists at the 2016 Summer Olympics
Commonwealth Games medallists in swimming
Commonwealth Games gold medallists for Australia
Swimmers at the 2018 Commonwealth Games
Medallists at the 2018 Commonwealth Games